John Falconer may refer to: 

 John Falconer (merchant) (fl. 1547), English merchant and botanist
 John Falconer (Jesuit) (1577–1656), English Jesuit
 John Falconer (bishop) (ca. 1660–1723), Prelate of the Scottish Episcopal Church
 John Mackie Falconer (1820–1903), etcher, painter and watercolourist
 John Falconer (MP) (1674-1764), Member of Parliament for Kincardineshire
 John A. Falconer (1844–1900), American soldier in the American Civil War
 John Downie Falconer (1876–1947), Scottish geologist and geographer
 John Ireland Falconer (1879–1954), Lord Provost of Edinburgh
 John Falconer (footballer) (1902–1982), Scottish footballer
 John Falconer (actor), including roles in The Pied Piper
 John Falconer (poker player) (born c. 1955), British poker player
 John Falconer, a character in On the Run

See also
 Falconer (surname)
 John Falkner (disambiguation)
 John Fauconer (fl. 1421), MP for Devizes